Jaime Augusto Richards III<ref name="EW">{{cite web|url=http://www.ew.com/article/2000/09/26/angels-new-actor-discusses-life-set|title=Angels new actor discusses life on the set
 |publisher=Entertainment Weekly|author=Bonin, Liane|author-link=Liane Bonin|date=2000-09-26|access-date=August 18, 2009}}</ref> (born August 28, 1973), commonly known as J. August Richards''', is an American actor. He is best known for his portrayal of Charles Gunn on The WB television series Angel and Michael Peterson/Deathlok on Agents of S.H.I.E.L.D.Early life
Richards is of Afro-Panamanian descent. He grew up in Bladensburg, Maryland. Richards attended the Visual and Performing Arts program at Suitland High School in Suitland, Maryland and graduated in 1991. He attended the USC School of Dramatic Arts on a scholarship.

Career

Richards's acting career began when he was spotted by a casting director. This resulted in him getting a guest star role on The Cosby Show as Vanessa's boyfriend Roy in the season 5 episode "Out of Brooklyn". Other guest appearances would come later on shows such as The Practice, Chicago Hope, Any Day Now, and Nash Bridges. Playing a rapping bike messenger who believes he is an alien abductee, it was the role of Taj Mahal in the Mark Taper Forum production of Tina Landau's play Space that first brought recognition.

Richards has appeared in feature films Why Do Fools Fall in Love and Good Burger. He starred in the television movies Critical Assembly and Mutiny, and appeared as singer Richard Street in the NBC miniseries The Temptations. Richards has also guest-starred on The West Wing and The 4400.

Richards gained a recurring role beginning in the first season of Angel as Charles Gunn, a street-wise vampire hunter. He was promoted to a regular at the start of the second season, and remained a member of the cast throughout the rest of the show's run.

Richards has so far been featured in four series as an attorney: Beginning in the first episode of season five of Angel, "Conviction," Gunn becomes a lawyer after having his brain upgraded with a comprehensive knowledge of the law (both human and dæmonic) by the international and interdimensional law firm Wolfram & Hart. In 2006, Richards joined the cast of NBC's Law & Order spin-off Conviction as Billy Desmond, an undefeated New York City Assistant District Attorney with political aspirations. He has also been featured in CBS's CSI: Miami as the Floridian attorney Bob Villa, and portrayed attorney Marcus McGrath in the TNT series Raising the Bar until its cancellation.

Richards portrayed a young Richard Webber in two Grey's Anatomy episodes: "The Time Warp" in season six, and "Only Mama Knows" in season eleven. He also appeared in an episode of The Mentalist. Richards had played the part of Damon in "Just Say Yes", a 1998 episode of the science fiction television series Sliders. Richards also guest-starred in an episode of Syfy's Warehouse 13.

On April 5, 2013, TVLine confirmed that Richards had been given an unspecified role in ABC's Agents of S.H.I.E.L.D.  The character was later revealed to be a character named Mike Peterson, a human being with implants for injections of super-serum (similar to those of Captain America) known as Deathlok.

Also in 2013, Richards created his own sci-fi web series called The Hypnotist''.

Personal life
Richards publicly came out as gay in April 2020.

Filmography

Film

Television

References

External links

 
 

1973 births
Living people
Male actors from Washington, D.C.
American male film actors
American people of Panamanian descent
Hispanic and Latino American actors
People from Bladensburg, Maryland
20th-century American male actors
21st-century American male actors
American male television actors
USC School of Dramatic Arts alumni
American gay actors
LGBT people from Washington, D.C.
LGBT people from Maryland
LGBT Hispanic and Latino American people
LGBT African Americans
20th-century African-American people
21st-century African-American people